The 2002 Alabama Crimson Tide football team (variously "Alabama", "UA", "Bama" or "The Tide") represented the University of Alabama in the 2002 NCAA Division I-A football season. It was the Crimson Tide's 108th overall season, 70th as a member of the Southeastern Conference (SEC) and its 11th within the SEC Western Division. The team was led by head coach Dennis Franchione, in his second year, and played their home games at Bryant–Denny Stadium in Tuscaloosa, Alabama. They finished the season with a record of 10–3 (6–2 in the SEC) to finish in first place in the SEC West; however, the team was ineligible to compete in the 2002 SEC Championship Game or a bowl game due to a two-year postseason ban imposed as part of the penalty for National Collegiate Athletic Association (NCAA) violations.

Summary
The team was led by second-year head coach Dennis Franchione. The team began the season with a 4–1 record, only losing a very close game to then #8 ranked Oklahoma. On October 5, the Crimson Tide lost another hard-fought game to the #4 Georgia 27–25 at home. The team would then defeat their next five opponents by an average of 24.4 points. In the 2002 Iron Bowl, the team was defeated by the Auburn Tigers by a score of 17–7. The team would end their season by defeating Hawaii. Though the team finished at 10–3 (6–2) and atop the SEC West standings, they were ineligible to play in the postseason due to receiving NCAA sanctions in 2001.

On December 5, head coach Dennis Franchione left the University of Alabama to take a head coaching job at Texas A&M which was left vacant by the firing of R. C. Slocum.

Schedule

Source: Rolltide.com All-time Football Results: 2002 Season

Roster

Coaching staff

Game summaries

Middle Tennessee

In the only game that Alabama would play at Legion Field in 2002, the Crimson Tide would score a season opening win for the first time since 1999.

Oklahoma

The first road game of the year for Alabama would prove to be one of the most exciting game of the year. Despite trailing 23-3 at halftime, Alabama roared back in the second half with 24 unanswered points to take a 27-23 lead late into the 4th quarter. Oklahoma however, scored the last 14 points to win 37-27.

North Texas

In the first game of the season at Bryant-Denny Stadium, The Crimson Tide would go over 500 yards of offense for the first time this season and win their first non-conference game at Bryant Denny Stadium since 1999. This game also was the first time since 1986 Alabama would not sellout their game at Bryant-Denny Stadium snapping a streak of 56 straight sellouts in Tuscaloosa.

Southern Miss

For the second straight week, Alabama would hold their opponent to under 150 yards of total offense to win their third game of the season. This would be  Ahmaad Galloway final game at Alabama as he would tear his ACL in the 4th quarter.

Arkansas

Shaud Williams would take the opening play 80 yards for a touchdown as the Crimson Tide beat Arkansas on the road for the first time since 1996.

Georgia

Georgia would use a Billy Bennett 32 yard field goal to beat Alabama in the first meeting between teams since 1995.

Ole Miss

Santonio Beard tied Shaun Alexander record of five rushing touchdowns in a game as Alabama dominated Ole Miss on Homecoming.

Tennessee

For the first time since 1994, Alabama beat Tennessee snapping a seven year win streak that the Vols had. To date, this was the longest streak by any opponent over the Tide.

Vanderbilt

For the second year in a row, the Crimson Tide traveled to Vanderbilt and for the 18th straight time Alabama would beat Vanderbilt. This would be the last time Alabama would play Vanderbilt until 2006 snapping a 50 consecutive seasons streak of playing.

Mississippi State

Alabama used their offense in the first half and their defense in the second half to preserve second straight win against the Bulldogs for the first time since 1994-95. This game was not televised making it the first Alabama game since 1995 not to be on live television.

LSU

Alabama defense would record a shutout for the first time since 1997 as they defeated the LSU Tigers in Baton Rouge.

Auburn

Alabama would trail for the first time since the Georgia game earlier in the season as Auburn would upset Alabama to continue their undefeated mark in Iron Bowl's played in Tuscaloosa.

Hawaii

Alabama would clinch 10 wins for the first time since 1999 as Alabama beat Hawaii to end the season 10-3. This would be Dennis Franchione last game as coach at Alabama as he would leave to be Texas A&M Head Coach on December 4th, 2002.

References

Alabama
Alabama Crimson Tide football seasons
Alabama Crimson Tide football